Shawn Petroski (born 24 August 1977) is an American former professional footballer who played as a forward.

Career
Petroski started his professional career with 2. Bundesliga side Uerdingen 05 in 1996, making six appearances. He joined the second team of 1860 Munich in 1998.

Personal life
After retiring, Petroski took up a soccer coaching post at Wesclin High School.

References

External links
 Profile at FIFA
 

1977 births
Living people
American soccer players
Association football forwards
KFC Uerdingen 05 players
TSV 1860 Munich II players
Regionalliga players
2. Bundesliga players
American expatriate soccer players
American expatriate soccer players in Germany